Boletochaete is a genus of fungi in the family Boletaceae. The genus contains three species found in Africa and southeast Asia. American mycologist Rolf Singer circumscribed the genus in 1944.

References

Boletaceae
Boletales genera
Taxa named by Rolf Singer